Ivan Marić (born 3 August 1994) is a Serbian professional  footballer who is playing for Satdobato Youth Club.

Club career

Early years
Born in Čačak, Marić came through the youth academy of his local side Borac Čačak. He later moved to another local club Sloboda Čačak. In the 2013-14 season, he played for Zvezdara in the Belgrade Zone League.

Professional career
In early 2015, as a young prospect at the age of 20, Marić moved up two tiers to join Serbian First League club Sloga Kraljevo. He would make 10 appearances up to the end of 2014–15 season. After the season, Marić moved abroad to pursue a trial at Macedonian side Mladost Carev Dvor. 

After spending the 2015–16 season with Jedinstvo Bijelo Polje in the Montenegrin Second League, Marić moved to Lokomotíva Zvolen, with which he stayed until the end of 2016. 

In March 2017, now a professional with foreign experience, Marić returned to his home country Serbia’s First League, signing with Jagodina. That summer, Marić took his experience abroad to the Maltese Premier League, joining Mosta.

Asia
In the 2018-19 season, Marić took a leap away from his home continent. Playing in the Hong Kong First Division, he was a registered foreign player for Wong Tai Sin, alongside veteran compatriot Ivan Kurtušić.

In the 2019-20 season, he was invited to join King Fung in the same division. His performances for the club received positive comments from the media, as he went on the scoresheet 4 times despite the season having been shortened by  the pandemic.

Back to Europe
In January 2021, Marić became Valletta F.C.'s defender in the final hours of the January transfer window, as the club's intention was to replace Serbian defender Mihailo Jovanovic, who left the club to return to his homeland on account of family mourning. He left the club again at the end of the season.

Return to Asia
After a trial period, Marić returned to Asia, when he signed with V.League 1 club SHB Da Nang FC on 30 December 2021. 

On 21 April 2022, Marić signed for Bangladesh Premier League side Swadhinata KS during the mid season transfer window.

Career statistics

Club

Honours
Jedinstvo Bijelo Polje
Montenegrin Second League: 2015–16

References

External links
 
 
 
 Maric, Ivan at Malta Football Association
 Maric, Ivan at Serbian First League
 Maric, Ivan - Hong Kong Football Association Ltd

1994 births
Living people
Serbian footballers
Serbian expatriate footballers
Sportspeople from Čačak
Association football defenders
FK Zvezdara players
FK Polet Ljubić players
FK Sloga Kraljevo players
FK Jagodina players
FK Jedinstvo Bijelo Polje players
MFK Lokomotíva Zvolen players
Mosta F.C. players
Hong Kong Sapling players
Valletta F.C. players
SHB Da Nang FC players
Serbian First League players
Hong Kong First Division League players
2. Liga (Slovakia) players
Maltese Premier League players
Serbian expatriate sportspeople in Montenegro
Serbian expatriate sportspeople in Slovakia
Serbian expatriate sportspeople in Malta
Serbian expatriate sportspeople in Hong Kong
Serbian expatriate sportspeople in Vietnam
Expatriate footballers in Montenegro
Expatriate footballers in Slovakia
Expatriate footballers in Malta
Expatriate footballers in Hong Kong
Expatriate footballers in Vietnam